Maya Michelle Rockeymoore Cummings (born January 31, 1971) is an American consultant, politician, and former chair of the Maryland Democratic Party in the United States. Before her election as party chair, she briefly ran for Governor of Maryland. She owns a Washington, D.C.-based consulting firm.

Rockeymore Cummings was a candidate in the 2020 Maryland 7th congressional district special election to fill out the term of her late husband, Elijah Cummings, and was also a candidate in the overlapping regular 2020 election for the same congressional seat.

Early life and career
Rockeymore Cummings graduated from John Jay High School in San Antonio, Texas. She earned her bachelor's degree from Prairie View A&M University, and then attended Purdue University, where she studied political science. She earned a master's degree in 1996 and a Doctor of Philosophy in political science, with an emphasis in public policy, in 2000.

Career 
From 1995 to 1997, Rockeymoore Cummings was the Administrative Assistant to the Director at the Marion County, Indiana Department of Health. In September 1997, she then moved to Washington, D.C., and became a legislative fellow for the Congressional Black Caucus under former Rep. Melvin Watt. In 1998, she moved to the United States House Ways and Means Subcommittee on Social Security as a professional staffer, until January 1999, at which time she began working as the Chief of Staff for former Congressman Charles Rangel.

In 2017, Rockeymoore Cummings announced she would run for governor of Maryland in the 2018 election. She received an endorsement from EMILY's List when she ran for Governor of Maryland. In January 2018, after her husband was hospitalized she dropped out of the race.

In December 2018, Rockeymoore Cummings was elected as chair of the Maryland Democratic Party, succeeding Kathleen Matthews. Under her leadership the party was overspending and its bank balance fell from $700,000 to $360,000.

On November 11, 2019, she announced on The Rachel Maddow Show that she would stand in the 2020 Maryland's 7th congressional district special election, to campaign for the seat previously held by her husband. In the February 4, 2020 Democratic primary Rockeymoore Cummings finished second to Kweisi Mfume who went on to win the April 28, 2020 special election. She was also a candidate for a full term of the same seat in the June 6 Democratic primary.

Personal life 
Rockeymoore Cummings married Elijah Cummings, a member of the United States House of Representatives who represented , in 2008. They remained married until his death in 2019. Rep. Cummings had three children from earlier relationships; Rockeymoore Cummings is stepmother to his two daughters and one son.

References

External links

1971 births
African-American people in Maryland politics
African-American women in politics
Living people
Maryland Democratic Party chairs
Maryland Democrats
Prairie View A&M University alumni
Purdue University alumni
Women in Maryland politics
21st-century African-American people
21st-century African-American women
20th-century African-American people
20th-century African-American women